The Battle of Shallow Ford was an American Revolution skirmish that took place on October 14, 1780 in Huntsville, North Carolina. A company of 600 Loyalist militia, led by Colonel Gideon Wright and his brother Captain Hezikiah Wright, were attempting to cross the Yadkin River to join General Cornwallis in Charlotte, which the British forces had captured two weeks prior. Colonel Joseph Williams gathered 300 Patriot militia and laid an ambush at the ford.

A short battle followed, with the Patriot forces winning decisively. The Loyalist militia became scattered and fled. Fifteen casualties were reported, fourteen Loyalists and one Patriot, Henry Francis, a captain in the Virginia militia. A tombstone at the site of the skirmish honors Francis. The Big Poplar Tree, a landmark at the site, is believed to have been shot out during the battle.

The Battle of Shallow Ford was one of several successful attempts to delay British reinforcements to Charlotte, along with the largest Battle of King's Mountain and other small skirmishes throughout the Carolinas. Facing constant harassment from Patriot militias and unable to secure reinforcement, Cornwallis was forced to retreat south in November. 

The battle shares its name with a play written by Ed Simpson, a native of nearby Lewisville.

References

Conflicts in 1780
Shallow Ford
Battles involving Great Britain
Battles involving the United States
Shallow Ford
1780 in North Carolina
Yadkin County, North Carolina